American Grain Complex, also known as "The American," Russell-Miller Milling Co. Elevator, and Peavey Co. Elevator, is a historic grain elevator and flour milling complex located in South Buffalo, Buffalo, Erie County, New York. The complex consists of three contributing buildings and two contributing structures. They are the Elevator Building (1905/1906, 1931), Flour Building (1906-1924), office building (c. 1920), Moveable Marine Tower, and railroad tracks.  The Elevator Building consists of the mainhouse, workhouse, and fixed marine tower, all built in 1905–1906, and an annex constructed in 1931.  The complex was last owned by ConAgra Foods, who closed the elevator and mill in June 2001.

It was listed on the National Register of Historic Places in 2012.

References

External links

Historic American Engineering Record in New York (state)
Industrial buildings and structures on the National Register of Historic Places in New York (state)
Infrastructure completed in 1931
Grain elevators in New York (state)
Buildings and structures in Buffalo, New York
National Register of Historic Places in Buffalo, New York